David Rui de Kong Cardoso (born 13 December 1994) is a Macanese professional footballer who most recently played as a defensive midfielder for Chiangrai United.

Club career
On 28 January 2017, Cardoso made his professional debut with Braga B in a 2016–17 LigaPro match against Cova da Piedade.

On 31 January 2019, Bordeaux announced that they had signed Cardoso to a 2.5-year contract.

International career
He can represent Macau but hasn't got a call-up from the Macau national football team

References

External links

Stats and profile at LPFP 

1994 births
Living people
Macau footballers
Macau people of Portuguese descent
Association football midfielders
Liga Portugal 2 players
Segunda Divisão players
S.C. Braga B players
C.D. Cova da Piedade players
FC Girondins de Bordeaux players
Chinese expatriate footballers
Chinese expatriate sportspeople in Portugal
Expatriate footballers in Portugal
Chinese expatriate sportspeople in France
Expatriate footballers in France